The Kohala Bridge across the Jhelum River, a tributary of the Indus River, forms part of one of the land routes from the Azad Kashmir to Punjab, Pakistan.

A bridge was constructed in 1877 and vanished in an 1890 flood. A new transportable steel bridge was constructed in 1899, and in 1990 it too vanished in a flood. A third bridge was constructed on the north edge of Union Council Birote Kalan, Abbottabad District, in 1993.

References 

Abbottabad District
Bridges in Pakistan
Bridges over the Jhelum River